The Worthington-New Haven State Road, also known as the Old State Road, is a major road in north-central Ohio, United States, extending from the Columbus suburb of Worthington, in Franklin County, to the village of New Haven, in Huron County, Ohio.

History 
In the early 1800s, the legislature of Ohio authorized many state roads to be constructed, in order to connect the major cities of the state with well-engineered roadways (in order to replace the often-treacherous Native American trails, which were still the primary thoroughfares).    The Worthington-New Haven state road was built circa 1820 after an act passed by the General Assembly authorized its construction. Unlike many other pre-railroad state roads around Ohio, the New Haven road was evidently not significantly realigned over its lifetime, with exception of the section near Alum Creek Lake (which partially inundated the road south of U.S. Route 36).

References

External links
 

State highways in Ohio
Transportation in Huron County, Ohio
Transportation in Franklin County, Ohio